Lucien Lamoureux,  (August 3, 1920 – July 16, 1998) was a Canadian politician and Speaker of the House of Commons of Canada from 1966 to 1974. He is the second longest-serving occupant of that office.

After graduating with a law degree from Osgoode Hall in 1945, Lamoureux worked as a political aide to Lionel Chevrier, a Canadian Cabinet minister in the government of Prime Minister William Lyon Mackenzie King. In 1954, he left Chevrier's office to establish a law practice in Cornwall, Ontario.

Lamoureux was first elected to the House of Commons of Canada in the 1962 election as a Liberal Member of Parliament (MP). In 1963, he became Deputy Speaker of the House of Commons and decided to stop attending meetings of the Liberal caucus in order to maintain impartiality. Following the 1965 election, Prime Minister Lester Pearson nominated him to the position of Speaker of the House of Commons.

Lamoureux served as speaker during two minority governments, 1965–1968 and 1972–1974, experiences that required him to maintain authority and neutrality in a situation where no party had control of the House.

In the 1968 election, he decided to follow the custom of the Speaker of the House of Commons of the United Kingdom and stand for election as an Independent.  Both the Liberal Party and the Progressive Conservative Party agreed not to run candidates against him. The New Democratic Party, however, declined to withdraw their candidate. Lamoureux was re-elected and continued to serve as Speaker.

In the 1972 election, Lamoureux again ran as an Independent, this time both the Tories and the NDP ran candidates against him. Lamoureux won re-election by a margin of 5,000 votes. Without an all-party agreement to not run against sitting Speakers in general elections, however, Lamoureux's wish for Canada to follow the British precedent was doomed, and future Speakers would not repeat his attempt to run as an Independent. As the election produced a minority government for the Liberals who had only two more seats than the Conservatives, the closeness of it was perhaps the reason why the opposition parties would choose not to follow such a precedent.
In April 1974, Lamoureux became the longest serving Speaker in the history of the Canadian House of Commons, surpassing the record set by Rodolphe Lemieux. In September 1974, Lamoureux announced that he would not run in the 1974 election, and retired from Parliament. He was appointed Canadian Ambassador to Belgium following the election. Lamoureux died in 1998.

In 1998, he was made an Officer of the Order of Canada.

On October 12, 2009, Peter Milliken surpassed Lamoureux's record to become the longest-serving occupant of the Speaker's Chair.

External links
 
 Speakers of the Canadian House of Commons biography

References

1920 births
1998 deaths
Independent MPs in the Canadian House of Commons
Liberal Party of Canada MPs
Members of the House of Commons of Canada from Ontario
Members of the King's Privy Council for Canada
Officers of the Order of Canada
Politicians from Ottawa
Speakers of the House of Commons of Canada
Franco-Ontarian people
Ambassadors of Canada to Belgium
Ambassadors of Canada to Luxembourg
Ambassadors of Canada to Portugal